The 1978 Memphis State Tigers football team represented Memphis State University (now known as the University of Memphis) as an independent during the 1978 NCAA Division I-A football season. In its fourth season under head coach Richard Williamson, the team compiled a 4–7 record and was outscored by a total of 297 to 200. The team played its home games at Liberty Bowl Memorial Stadium in Memphis, Tennessee. 

The team's statistical leaders included Lloyd Patterson with 931 passing yards, Eddie Hill with 739 rushing yards, and Earnest Gray with 690 receiving yards and 54 points scored.

Schedule

References

Memphis State
Memphis Tigers football seasons
Memphis State Tigers football